Sun-hee, also spelled Son-hui or Seon-hui, is a Korean feminine given name. Its meaning differs based on the hanja used to write each syllable of the name. There are 41 hanja with the reading "sun" and 24 hanja with the reading "hee" on the South Korean government's official list of hanja which may be registered for use in given names.

People with this name include:
Consort Yeong (1696–1764), also known as Lady Seonhui, consort to Yeongjo of Joseon
Lee Sun-hee (singer) (born 1964), South Korean singer
Yoo Sun-hee (born 1967), South Korean female speed skater 
Mun Seon-hui (born 1968), South Korean voice actress
Han Sun-hee (born 1973), South Korean team handball player 
Lee Sun-hee (taekwondo) (born 1978), South Korean taekwondo practitioner 
Woo Sun-hee (born 1978), South Korean team handball player
Kil Son-hui (born 1985), North Korean football forward
Kwak Ji-min (born Kwak Sun-hee, 1985), South Korean actress
Hwang Sun-hee (born 1986), South Korean actress
Chang Son-hui, North Korean actress who starred in the 1985 film Pulgasari

Fictional characters with this name include:
Sunhi, the titular character of 2013 South Korean film Our Sunhi

See also
List of Korean given names

References

Korean feminine given names